Pomacea ocanensis is a species of freshwater snail in the Ampullariidae family native to Colombia. Wilhelm Kobelt originally described the species as a subspecies of Ampullaria auriformis in 1914. A critically endangered species, P. ocanensis faces threats of declining habitat quality due to urbanization, local water management, and pollution. It is the only member of Pomacea considered Endangered or Critically Endangered by the IUCN and one of only two Ampullariids to be Critically Endangered.

See also 
 List of critically endangered molluscs

References 

ocanensis
Freshwater snails
Molluscs of South America
Gastropods described in 1914